Brigita Virbalytė-Dimšienė (born 1 February 1985 in Alytus) is a female professional race walker who competes internationally for Lithuania. She participated at the 2009 World Championships in Athletics and reached 24th place. She is also a Lithuanian National Radio and Television sports journalist. In 2010, she became national champion at the Druskininkai 10 km walking event, winning in a personal best of 44:42 minutes.

International competitions

References

1985 births
Living people
Lithuanian female racewalkers
Lithuanian journalists
Lithuanian women journalists
Sportspeople from Alytus
Sportspeople from Vilnius
Athletes (track and field) at the 2012 Summer Olympics
Athletes (track and field) at the 2016 Summer Olympics
Athletes (track and field) at the 2020 Summer Olympics
Olympic athletes of Lithuania
World Athletics Championships athletes for Lithuania
Competitors at the 2007 Summer Universiade
20th-century Lithuanian women
21st-century Lithuanian women